The  is a general hospital in Rosario, Argentina, which depends on the Health Ministry of the provincial state of Santa Fe. It is a public hospital (managed partly by an elected council) and serves as the base hospital for Programmatic Area III of Zone VIII of the Santa Fe Ministry of Health.

The HPR was the first hospital in Rosario and the first in the south of Santa Fe. At the time of its foundation, the hospital was outside the main populated area of the then-small village of Rosario (which had little over 3,000 inhabitants).

Presently the HPR is located in the center of the city (taking up a whole block) and serves an area with a population estimate of 386,000 residents, treating 182,000 people a year, admitting 25 patients a day, and performing 300 surgeries per month. The hospital also manages 16 primary care centers distributed in the southern part of Rosario.

References
 La Capital, 4 October 2005. El Hospital Provincial de Rosario celebra su 150 aniversario. 

Provincial de Rosario
Buildings and structures in Rosario, Santa Fe
Provincial de Rosario